Skt or SKT may refer to:

SK Telecom T1 or SKT T1, e-Sports team of SK Telecom, South Korea
 Sialkot International Airport, Pakistan, IATA code
 DJ S.K.T, a British dance musician